Unadilla Village Historic District is a national historic district located at Unadilla in Otsego County, New York.  It encompasses 145 contributing buildings, two contributing sites, one contributing structure, and three contributing objects.  the majority of the buildings are residential (79, with 41 contributing dependencies), with four churches, 11 commercial buildings, six institutional and/or public buildings, one historic cemetery, three monuments, and a limestone railroad underpass.

It was listed on the National Register of Historic Places in 1992.

References

Historic districts on the National Register of Historic Places in New York (state)
Houses on the National Register of Historic Places in New York (state)
Georgian architecture in New York (state)
Federal architecture in New York (state)
Historic districts in Otsego County, New York
National Register of Historic Places in Otsego County, New York